Mogu is a painting skill or technique in traditional Chinese painting. It literally means "boneless".

On paintings in the style of mogu, forms are made by ink and color washes rather than by outlines.

Derivation of the name

There are mainly two derivatives:
 Mogu-Hua (Traditional Chinese: 沒骨畫, or 沒骨畵; Simplified Chinese: 没骨画; Pinyin: Mògǔ Huà; "Huà" means "to paint"), mainly mentions the painting or work has such style or created by such technique.
 Mogu-Fa (Traditional Chinese: 沒骨法; Simplified Chinese: 没骨法; Pinyin: Mògǔ Fǎ; "Fǎ" means method or technique) emphasizes the technique.

History

According to some ancient records, the technique was first created and theorized by Zhang Sengyou of the Liang Dynasty in 557 during the Southern dynasties period.

During the period of the Five Dynasties and Ten Kingdoms period, a painter named Huang Quan (黄筌) from Former Shu significantly developed the techniques in bird-and-flower painting, especially in painting trees and flowers, and his painting was called as the fine-sounding name Mogu Huazhi (沒骨花枝).

In Tang Dynasty, notable painters mastered this technique includes Yang Sheng (楊升).

Xu Chongsi (徐崇嗣) during the Northern Song Dynasty continued developing the technique from Huang, and his paintings were named Mogu-Tu (沒骨圖). Xu started applying this technique in shan shui painting.

The technique gained popularity during the Late-Ming Dynasty and Qing Dynasty, and the most famous master would be Yun Shouping.

The technique

The method mainly is a staining and dying one, by using ink brush pens. Less or absolutely no sketch or drawing, so people can hardly observe solid lines or curves in the painting.

There are basically three Mogu staining methods: the staining by smearing (渲染; Xuàn-Rǎn), the staining by dotting (点染; Diǎn-Rǎn), and the staining by just filling colours (填染; Tián-Rǎn).

See also
 Yun Shouping: widely regarded as the top Mogu painter.
 Mogu painting is mainly applied in:
 Chinese painting
 Danqing
 Ink wash painting 
 Shan shui painting
 Blue-green shan shui painting
 Bird-and-flower painting

References

Chinese painting
Chinese art
Painting techniques